Mount Evil is a summit in Bradley County, Tennessee, in the United States.

References

Landforms of Bradley County, Tennessee
Mountains of Tennessee